The A Lyga is the top division of professional football in Lithuania. It is organized by Lithuanian Football Federation (LFF).

History
The first football league was established in Lithuania in 1924, and in various forms existed until 1939. During the period of Soviet occupation, a Lithuanian amateur top division existed, while professional players played in USSR football competitions. The Lithuanian professional top division was restored in 1991. The naming convention changed several times, but since 1999 the league is consistently referred to as A lyga.

Format
The league system and size have also stabilized since 1999. League size varied mostly between 8 and 10 teams, with the exceptions of 2011 A Lyga featuring 12 teams, and 2020 A Lyga record low of only 6 teams. The teams play 4 rounds in regular season. The bottom placed team is relegated, while 9th placed team contests in a play-off with the 2nd placed team from the I lyga. The final list of participants often did not correlate to the final results of the previous season, as the participation were rather finalized through the Lithuanian Football Federation league licensing process. 

The season usually kicks off in late February or early March and ends in November. Because of harsh climate, there are no games in winter. Early spring and late autumn games are played in indoor arenas on artificial grass. Winter transfer window opens in early January through to mid March. Summer transfer window lasts for the most part of July.

European competitions
Lithuania sought to participate in the UEFA club competitions immediately after regaining the independence. However, due to political reasons, in 1991 Lithuania was banned by UEFA from continental competitions refusing licensing of Žalgiris to compete as a Lithuanian club rather than a Soviet club. Eventually, Lithuania became affiliated with UEFA in 1992. The A Lyga champion secures the right to play in UEFA Champions League qualification. The runner up and the 3rd-place winner secure right to play in UEFA Europa Conference League qualification. 

Best Lithuanian club result in UEFA competitions was achieved in 2022-23 UEFA club competition season by FK Žalgiris. Lithuanian champions reached the group stage in the 2022–23 UEFA Europa Conference League. After the 2022-23 UEFA season, FK Žalgiris was the best performing A lyga club in Europe, taking #130 in UEFA Club Coefficients table.

Clubs

a Founding member of the A Lyga
b Never been relegated from the A Lyga
c Two former clubs, named FK Dainava have participated in A lyga in 2001, 2011, 2012, 2013, 2014

Sponsorship 

The official ball supplier for the A lyga games in 2023 is Adidas. Nike held this contract between 2013-2022, when they took over from Adidas.

Hall of Fame

Interbellum and WWII 
After Lithuania gained independence in 1918, the first ever football tournament was held in 1922.

Seasons 

Note: In 1924–1930, 1935, 1942, 1942–1943 and 1945 seasons there was no unified league and winners were decided using either a play–off format or a single game between winners of separate divisions.

Performance by club 

All champions from this period are defunct.

Post-War period and the Lithuanian SSR Championship 

During the Lithuania's Soviet occupation, each soviet republic ran their separate football championship. The clubs could either participate in the competition of the soviet republic, or in the Soviet Union football league system.

Seasons 

Note: The biggest and most notable clubs, such as Žalgiris Vilnius played in Soviet Union's Football  Premier League instead of Lithuanian SSR Divisions.

Performance by club 

Clubs currently playing in A Lyga are written in Bold. 
† - Defunct clubs.

Regained Independence and the A Lyga - present 

As Lithuania regained the independence in 1991, the Lithuanian Football Federation (LFF) was re-established, and A Lyga was shaped same year. The Soviet football divisions dissolved, and the teams that participated in them returned to the Lithuania's national championship.

List of champions (1991–)

Seasons

Performance by club 

Clubs currently playing in A Lyga are highlighted in Bold. 
† - Defunct clubs.

Spectators 
	
The average number of spectators per match remains very low in recent years.

References

External links
Official website 
Futbolo.TV - A lyga streaming and video center 
RSSSF.com - List of Champions
Lithuanian Football: History & Statistics by Almis - Championship statistics

 
LFF Lyga
1
Lithuania
Summer association football leagues
Professional sports leagues in Lithuania